2013 European Women's Sevens Championship

European Championship: Top 12, Round 1
Date/Venue: June 1–2, 2013 at Brive, France.

Group A

Netherlands 31-0 Wales
Russia 19-3 Portugal
England 34-0 Germany
Portugal 12-17 Wales
Netherlands 29-7 Germany
England 7-5 Russia
Germany 26-17 Wales
England 34-0 Portugal
Russia 17-7 Netherlands
Portugal 12-7 Germany
Russia 39-0 Wales
England 31-10 Netherlands
Russia 10-0 Germany
Netherlands 26-0 Portugal
England 42-0 Wales
Group B

Ukraine 27-0 Scotland
France 24-0 Italy
Spain 14-10 Ireland
Italy 38-5 Scotland
Ukraine 7-17 Ireland
Spain 0-24 France
Ireland 24-0 Scotland
Spain 33-0 Italy
France 45-0 Ukraine
Italy 10-29 Ireland
France 38-5 Scotland
Spain 12-5 Ukraine
France 17-5 Ireland
Ukraine 5-10 Italy
Spain 40-0 Scotland

BowlSemi-finals
Portugal 26-5 Scotland
Wales 36-0 Ukraine

11th Place
Scotland 0-19 Ukraine

Bowl final
Portugal 17-7 Wales

PlateSemi-finals
Netherlands 29-0 Italy
Germany 14-33 Ireland

7th Place
Italy 24-0 Germany

Plate final
Netherlands 7-12 Ireland 

CupSemi-finals
England 26-0 Spain
Russia 12-10 France

3rd Place
Spain 35-5 France

Cup final
England 30-7 Russia

European Championship: Top 12, Round 2
Date/Venue: June 14–15, 2013 at Marbella, Spain.

Group A

Ireland 31-5 Scotland
France 28-0 Germany
England 17-0 Portugal
Germany 22-19 Scotland
Ireland 19-0 Portugal
England 0-26 France
Portugal 12-12 Scotland
England 40-0 Germany
France 10-7 Ireland
Germany 0-12 Portugal
France 33-0 Scotland
England 17-0 Ireland
France 19-3 Portugal
Ireland 24-12 Germany
England 31-7 Scotland
Group B

Netherlands 12-7 Ukraine
Spain 33-7 Italy
Russia 41-0 Wales
Italy 22-7 Ukraine
Netherlands 17-21 Wales
Russia 19-12 Spain
Wales 12-0 Ukraine
Russia 28-12 Italy
Spain 33-0 Netherlands
Italy 10-7 Wales
Spain 24-0 Ukraine
Russia 29-0 Netherlands
Spain 19-0 Wales
Netherlands 5-12 Italy
Russia 42-0 Ukraine

BowlSemi-finals
Germany 0-24 Ukraine
Scotland 0-43 Netherlands

11th-place play-off
Germany 31-3 Scotland

Bowl final
 Ukraine 12-31 Netherlands

PlateSemi-finals
England 19-14 Wales
Portugal 5-14 Italy

7th-place play-off
Wales 17-14 Portugal

Plate final
England 19-12 Italy

CupSemi-finals
France 12-5 Spain
Ireland 5-27 Russia

3rd-place play-off
Spain 14-7 Ireland

Cup final
France 12-29 Russia

Finals positions
1	Russia	38
2	England	32
3	France	32
4	Spain	32
5	Ireland	26
6	Italy	18
7	Netherlands	14
8	Wales	11
9	Portugal	10
10	Germany	8
11	Ukraine	5
12	Scotland	2

References

 
Rugby Europe Women's Sevens
Europe
Sevens